Vinnaithaandi Varuvaayaa is a 2016 Tamil musical short drama starring Vikraman Radhakrishnan, Madhumila, Uma Padmanabhan and Uma Riyaz Khan. The show premiered on 3 October 2016 and aired on Mondays to Saturday at 7:30PM (IST) on Star Vijay, starting from 31 October 2016, the show shifted to aired at 10:00PM (IST) and ended with 29 episodes. It was Produced by Tamil Film actor R. Sarathkumar and director by Sundar K. Vijayan.

Cast

Main Cast
 Madhumila as Abirami (Abi)
 Vikraman Radhakrishnan as Vikram

Supporting Cast
 Divya Ganesh as Kani
 Uma Riyaz Khan as Gayathiri
 Uma Padmanabhan as Kalyani
 Senu
 Parthan Siva as Vishnu Varthan
 Anuradha Krishnamurthy
 George Vishnu
 Raani as Malavika
 Sambhavi as Varshini
 Sathiy Sai
 Karthik
 Sivaji Manohar as Jakku
 Puviarasu

Title song
It was written by lyricist K.Cho. It was sung by Mayanathi Ananthu, Anand Aravindakshan and Revathi P.V.

Soundtrack

Airing history 
The show started airing on STAR Vijay & Vijay HD on 3 October 2016, and it aired Monday through Saturday at 7:30PM IST. Later its timing changed started from Monday 31 October 2016, the show was shifted to 10:00PM IST time slot. A new show named Chandra Nandni replaced this show at 7:30PM IST

References

External links 
 Vinnaithaandi Varuvaayaa on Hotstar
 

Star Vijay original programming
Tamil-language musical television series
Tamil-language romance television series
2016 Tamil-language television series debuts
Tamil-language television shows
2016 Tamil-language television series endings
Television shows set in Tamil Nadu
Television shows set in Kolkata
Tamil-language television miniseries